Micro (ไมโคร) were a Thai rock band formed in 1983 in Bangkok, Thailand. They signed to the GMM Grammy. The group has released a six studio albums. The lead vocals for their first three albums was Amphol Lumpoon. And when Amphol Lumpoon left the band for solo career, Kraiphop Jandee became the band's lead vocals for the latter three albums. The band reunited in 2010s for concerts.

Current members

 Amphol Lumpoon (Nui): lead vocals
 Kraiphop Jandee (Kop): guitar, vocals
 Mana Prasertwong (Ouan): guitar
 Santhan Lauhawatanawit (Boy): keyboard
 Adinant Nokteat (Aod): bass
 Adisai Nokteat (Poo): drum

Discography

Studio Album
 ร็อค เล็ก เล็ก (Rock Lek Lek) (1986)
 หมื่นฟาเรนไฮด์ (Meun Fahrenheit) (1988)
 เต็มถัง (Tem Tang) (1989)
 เอี่ยมอ่องอรทัย (Eimong Oratai) (1991)
 สุริยคราส (Suriya Krast) (1995)
 ทางไกล (Tarng Krai) (1997)

External links
 Micro Rock Club - Micro Unofficial Website (Thai Only)

Thai rock music groups
Thai pop rock musicians
Thai pop rock musical groups
Musical groups established in 1983
Musical groups from Bangkok